The Living Rainforest is an indoor greenhouse tropical rainforest located in Hampstead Norreys in Berkshire, England. It is an ecological centre, educational centre and visitor attraction consisting of three glasshouses, operated and run by the Trust for Sustainable Living. The glasshouses are named Amazonica, Lowlands and Small Islands respectively.

The Living Rainforest has been accredited by the Council for Learning Outside of the Classroom and awarded the LOtC Quality Badge. Each year around 25,000 children visit the Living Rainforest as part of their school's curriculum. It is open 7-days a week from 09:30 to 16:00.

History

The site was once an orchid nursery called Wyld Court Orchids who were well known for their collection of rare and beautiful natural orchid species, especially Cymbidiums and Lycastes. Wyld Court Orchids received considerable recognition from the R.H.S. including a distinction of Grand Champion Hybrid and Best in Show for a home-raised seedling at the British Orchid Council Congress Show. The privately owned ‘Wyld Court Rainforest’ was created in 1991 by philanthropist Keith Bromley (former chairman of the shoe retailer Russell and Bromley) and horticulturalist Barry Findon. Keith Bromley said he was inspired to create Wyld Court Rainforest after sailing in the Orinoco delta in Venezuela in the 1980s. It first opened to the public in April 1993 as a rainforest visitor centre. They donated the facility to the World Land Trust in 1996. On 30 June 2000, ownership of Wyld Court Rainforest Ltd transferred from the World Land Trust to a new company "The Living Rainforest", and has been operated by Karl Hansen as an independent educational charity since July 2000. The centre is home to over 700 plants and animals including rare and endangered species of global conservation value.

Attractions
The visitor attraction consists of three glass houses that adjoin each other; the flora and fauna in each glass house are representative of different layers or areas of tropical rainforests. The rainforest layers represented in the Amazonica and Lowlands glasshouses include the canopy, understory and forest floor layers. The Small Islands glasshouse exhibits shows life at the edge of an island rainforest, the exhibits in this glasshouse are being developed to highlight the issues and concerns faced by Small Island Developing States (SIDS) throughout the world.

The Human Impact Building opened in 2006 incorporating sustainable materials, Low Embodied Energy, passive/natural ventilation, passive solar gain and a small photovoltaic solar array.

There is also a gift shop, cafe, outdoor adventure themed children’s playground and picnic area with a rainforest theme.

Exhibits
Dwarf Caiman exhibit completed July 2020, it is home to two male Dwarf Caiman
Orchid Cloud Forest exhibit completed January 2020 featuring 100 orchid species and other plants from Central and South America 
Littoral Zone project completed in October 2018 saw the introduction of plants in Small Islands often found at or just above the high water mark, these together with the mangroves exhibit represent the Littoral Zone
Bromeliads exhibit was introduced in August 2018, the concept of the exhibit is bromeliads growing on or around a fallen tree
Toucan exhibit was rebuilt in July 2018, it is home to a Channel-billed toucan (Ramphastos vitellinus) and a male Azara’s Agouti (Dasyprocta azarae)
Sustainable Futures exhibit was opened in January 2018, consists of interactive displays that include a look at Climate Drawdown
Snakes exhibit was rebuilt in February 2017, it is home to – two Emerald Tree Boas (Corallus caninus), a Green Tree Python (Morelia viridis) and a Carpet Python (Morelia spilota) 
Small Islands exhibit was built in August 2016, it is home to a Green Iguana, mudskippers, various tropical fish and mangroves
Armadillo exhibit was built in 2014, it is home to a Six-banded armadillo (Euphractus sexinctus)
Goeldi's Monkeys exhibit was rebuilt and relocated in 2014, it is home to a troop of 5 Goeldi's monkeys (Callimico goeldii) and a male Azara's Agouti (Dasyprocta azarae)
Fischer's Turacao exhibit was built in 2010 and is home to a pair of Fischer's Turacaos

Animals

Asian Water Dragon
Azara's agouti
Blue poison dart frog
Carpet Python
Channel-billed toucan
Dwarf Caiman
Emerald Tree Boa
Fischer's turaco
Goeldi's Monkey
Green Iguana
Green Tree Python
Home's hinge-back tortoise
Linne's Two-toed Sloth
Madagascar hissing cockroach
Philippines Water Monitor
Pygmy marmoset
Roul Roul Partridge
Six Banded Armadillo
Yellow-knobbed curassow
Ocellate river stingray

Plants
The Plant Collection at The Living Rainforest contains some of the most attractive species of the many tropical plant families such as bananas, bromeliads, calatheas, cinnamon, ficus, gingers, hoyas and orchids. However the highlights of the collection are the Aroids and the Philippine Jade Vine (seasonal). Plants of particular interest include;

Anthurium clavigerum
Anthurium crystallinum
Anthurium magnificum
Austrocylindropuntia subulata
Black Anthurium
Breadfruit
Giant Fern
Giant Taro
Hoya bhutanica
Jade Vine
Myriocarpa stipitata
King Anthurium
Philodendron melanochrysum
Philodendron melinonii
Pitcher Plants
Screw Pine
Silk Floss Tree
Travellers Palm
Typhonodorum lindleyanum
Cocoa tree

Gallery

References

External links

Tourist attractions in Berkshire
Zoos in England
Zoos established in 1993
Botanical gardens
Parks and open spaces in Berkshire
West Berkshire District
1993 establishments in England